"One Less Day (Dying Young)" is a song by American singer Rob Thomas. It is the first single from the album Chip Tooth Smile, released on February 20, 2019.

Background
He told Billboard that when he was in his 20s, he "simultaneously thought that I was going to live forever and I wasn't going to make it past 25".

"One Less Day" was prompted by the realization that, at 47, he "was already too old to die young".

Music
The song is about getting older and is an ode to life. He sees every day he lives as a privilege.

Charts

Weekly charts

Year-end charts

References

2019 singles
Rob Thomas (musician) songs
Songs written by Rob Thomas (musician)
Song recordings produced by Butch Walker
Atlantic Records singles
2019 songs